Sunset Peak or Tai Tung Shan (Chinese: 大東山) is the third-highest peak in Hong Kong and the second-highest on the island of Lantau. The second-highest of the territory and the highest on the island, the Lantau Peak, is located to its west.

Name 
The Cantonese name Tai Tung Shan (Chinese: 大東山; Cantonese Yale: daaih dūng shāan, Jyutping: Daai6 Dung1 Saan1) literally means "Big East Mountain".

Access 
Sunset Peak is only accessible by foot. Both campsites are served by a number of bus routes going to Mui Wo, Tung Chung, and other destinations on Lantau island.

See also
 List of mountains, peaks and hills in Hong Kong
Lantau Peak

References

Mountains, peaks and hills of Hong Kong
Lantau Island